Acanthodaphne pusula is an extinct species of sea snail, a marine gastropod mollusk in the family Raphitomidae.

Description
This species was first described by Charles Reed Laws in 1947 and named Puha pusula.

Distribution
Fossils of this marine species were found in Early Miocene strata in New Zealand

References

 Maxwell, P.A. (2009). Cenozoic Mollusca. pp 232–254 in Gordon, D.P. (ed.) New Zealand inventory of biodiversity. Volume one. Kingdom Animalia: Radiata, Lophotrochozoa, Deuterostomia. Canterbury University Press, Christchurch

External links
 Bonfitto A. & Morassi M. (2006). A new genus of Indo-West Pacific Turridae (Gastropoda: Prosobranchia). The Veliger. 48(3): 136-142

pusula
Gastropods described in 1947
Gastropods of New Zealand